In mathematics, fine topology can refer to:
 Fine topology (potential theory)
 The sense opposite to coarse topology, namely:
 A term in comparison of topologies which specifies the partial order relation of a topological structure to other one(s)
 Final topology

See also 
 Discrete topology, the most fine topology possible on a given set